Robert Louis Hartman (August 28, 1937 – June 16, 2010) was an American professional baseball player.

Hartman signed with his home-state Braves after graduation from Kenosha High School and began his minor league career in 1955. Three years later, he won 20 of 30 decisions for the Double-A Atlanta Crackers, tying for the Southern Association lead in wins and making the league's All-Star team.  The following season, with the Triple-A Louisville Colonels, Hartman had another fine season, with a 10–3 win–loss record, and was recalled to the Braves for one game in April and two more in June. He worked in three losing efforts in middle relief and was ineffective in two of them, allowing six hits, five earned runs and two bases on balls in only 1 innings pitched.

He returned to the Braves' farm system until June 24, 1962, when he was recalled from Louisville and traded to the Indians for infielder Ken Aspromonte.  Two days later, he made his first Major League start against the Detroit Tigers in the second game of a twi-night doubleheader.  Hartman lasted ten innings, allowed only three hits and one earned run with seven strikeouts, but left for a pinch hitter with the game tied, 1–1.  Relief pitcher Gary Bell worked the next two innings and got credit for a 3–1 Cleveland win.

In his next start five days later against the Chicago White Sox, Hartman started well with one run allowed in four innings, but in the fifth, he faced four batters and could not record an out, as Chicago scored three earned runs. Hartman made six more appearances as a relief pitcher for Cleveland in July 1962 before returning to the minor leagues, retiring in 1963 after nine professional seasons.

As a Major Leaguer, he allowed 20 hits and ten bases on balls, with 12 strikeouts, in 19 innings pitched.

References

External links

1937 births
2010 deaths
Atlanta Crackers players
Baseball players from Wisconsin
Beaumont Exporters players
Cleveland Indians players
Jacksonville Suns players
Louisville Colonels (minor league) players
Major League Baseball pitchers
Milwaukee Braves players
Salt Lake City Bees players
Sportspeople from Kenosha, Wisconsin
Vancouver Mounties players
Wichita Braves players
Mary D. Bradford High School alumni